John Rutherford Gibson (23 March 1898 – July 1974) was an American professional footballer who played as a full-back for Sunderland.

References

1898 births
1974 deaths
People from Philadelphia
American soccer players
Association football fullbacks
Blantyre Celtic F.C. players
Sunderland A.F.C. players
Hull City A.F.C. players
Sheffield United F.C. players
Luton Town F.C. players
English Football League players